Erimystax is a genus of ray-finned fish in the family Cyprinidae. Members are commonly known as  slender chubs, though "slender chub" is also used for individual species local to some area, particularly Erimystax cahni.

Species 
 Erimystax cahni (C. L. Hubbs & Crowe, 1956) (Slender chub)
 Erimystax dissimilis (Kirtland, 1840) (Streamline chub)
 Erimystax harryi (C. L. Hubbs & Crowe, 1956) (Ozark chub)
 Erimystax insignis (C. L. Hubbs & Crowe, 1956) (Blotched chub)
 Erimystax x-punctatus (C. L. Hubbs & Crowe, 1956) (Gravel chub)

References 

 

 
Fish of North America
Taxa named by David Starr Jordan 
Taxonomy articles created by Polbot